Immaculate Heart of Mary Catholic Church is a historic church southeast of Spearville in Windthorst, Kansas.  It was built during c. 1911–13 and added to the National Register of Historic Places in 1989.

References

Churches in the Roman Catholic Diocese of Dodge City
Former Roman Catholic church buildings in Kansas
Churches on the National Register of Historic Places in Kansas
Roman Catholic churches completed in 1911
Churches in Ford County, Kansas
National Register of Historic Places in Ford County, Kansas
20th-century Roman Catholic church buildings in the United States